Nikolai Semyonovich Golovanov (Nikoláy Semyónovich Golovánov) ([o.s. 9] 21 January 1891 – 28 August 1953), PAU, was a Soviet conductor and composer, who was married to the soprano Antonina Nezhdanova.

He conducted the premiere performances of a number of works, among them Nikolai Myaskovsky's Sixth Symphony in May 1924.

Golovanov held some of the highest musical positions in the USSR, including an extensive association with the Bolshoi Opera. In her autobiography, Galina Vishnevskaya terms him the theater's chief conductor, and tells of his dismissal from the Bolshoi and his death - which she attributed to the humiliation of the experience of losing this position. It has been reported that Golovanov's firing was the result of Stalin's displeasure at Golovanov's having tried to use a Jewish singer, Mark Reizen, in the title role of Tsar Boris Godunov in his recording of Mussorgsky's opera. Golovanov actually did record the opera with Reizen as Boris, but later remade Reizen's part with another Boris, Alexander Pirogov.

Golovanov's recorded output was substantial and quite individual in interpretive approach. In his discography we find all but one of the Liszt tone poems, the complete Scriabin symphonies and Piano Concerto, Tchaikovsky's First and Sixth symphonies, as well as shorter works, Beethoven's First Symphony, Violin Concerto and Triple Concerto, Rimsky-Korsakov's Scheherazade and his operas Sadko and Christmas Eve, Mussorgsky's Boris Godunov and Pictures at an Exhibition, Rachmaninoff's Second and Third symphonies, the opera Aleko and other compositions, Glazunov's Fifth, Sixth and Seventh symphonies, and scores by Grieg, Mozart and others. Based upon the evidence of his recordings, Golovanov's characteristic performance mode was full-blooded and nearly vehement in tone, with a powerful, almost overloaded sense of sonority, and extreme flexibility in matters of tempo, phrasing and dynamics.

In addition to audio recordings by Golovanov, there is extant visual representation of his conducting style. Possibly during the Second World War, evidently intended as a morale booster, there was produced a film of Golovanov conducting a group called the USSR State Symphony Orchestra in a performance of the Tchaikovsky "1812 Overture." As was the practice in the USSR, the Tsarist anthem was replaced in the score with the chorus "Glory, Glory to you, holy Russia!" from Glinka's "A Life for the Tsar." The film does not feature synchronous sound, and concerns itself primarily with various Soviet functionaries, Military figures and Orthodox Priests (!) in the audience; However, the short segments of Golovanov conducting show an energetic but physically spare conducting style, one seemingly at odds with the sometimes extreme nature of his interpretations.

Golovanov was also a composer; his works include the opera "Princess Yurata", a symphony and other orchestral works as well as choral music.

References

1891 births
1953 deaths
20th-century classical composers
20th-century Russian conductors (music)
Russian male conductors (music)
20th-century Russian male musicians
People's Artists of the RSFSR
People's Artists of the USSR
Stalin Prize winners
Recipients of the Order of Lenin
Recipients of the Order of the Red Banner of Labour
Russian classical composers
Russian male classical composers
Russian classical musicians
Soviet composers
Soviet male composers
Soviet conductors (music)
Burials at Novodevichy Cemetery